KDMB (88.7 FM) is a radio station licensed to Moses Lake, Washington, United States. The station is currently owned by Divine Mercy Broadcasting.

References

External links

DMB
Grant County, Washington
Radio stations established in 2010
2010 establishments in Washington (state)